Organizational architecture may refer to:

 Interdisciplinary Center for Organizational Architecture, a research center in Denmark
 Organization design, sometimes referred to as organizational architecture, the creation of roles, processes, and formal reporting relationships in an organization
 Organization development, the study and implementation of practices, systems, and techniques that affect organizational change
 Organizational space, sometimes referred to as organizational architecture, the influence of the spatial environment on humans in and around organizations.
 Organizational structure, a definition of how activities such as task allocation, coordination, and supervision are directed toward the achievement of organizational aims

See also 
 Architecture (disambiguation)
 Departmentalization
 Enterprise architecture
 Enterprise architecture framework